Anastasiya Andreyevna Tolmacheva and Maria Andreyevna Tolmacheva (born 14 January 1997, Kursk), known as the Tolmachevy Sisters, are identical twin singers and actresses from Kursk, Russia. Aged nine, they won the Junior Eurovision Song Contest 2006 with their song "Vesenniy jazz". Eight years later, they represented Russia in the Eurovision Song Contest 2014, placing seventh with the song "Shine".

The sisters released an album titled Polovinki in 2007, and appeared in the made-for-TV movie Kingdom of Crooked Mirrors.

Career

2006: Junior Eurovision Song Contest 2006

At the age of nine, the sisters represented Russia at the Junior Eurovision Song Contest 2006 in Bucharest, Romania after being selected from 20 acts in the national final held on 4 June 2006. They later won the Junior Eurovision by a clear margin with their song "Vesenniy jazz" which earned them 154 points, with Belarus finishing in second place with 129 points.

2007–2010: Polovinki and Eurovision appearances 
In 2007, the sisters released their first album Polovinki. They appeared in the movie Kingdom of Crooked Mirrors later that year. They also performed the song "Katyusha" on the Red Square in Moscow on Victory Day.

In 2009, the sisters made an appearance at the opening act of the first semi-final of the Eurovision Song Contest 2009 in Moscow, Russia. In 2010, the sisters were part of an interval act at the Junior Eurovision Song Contest 2010 in Minsk, Belarus, where previous winners of the contest sang their winning songs in a medley.

2014: Eurovision Song Contest 2014

The Tolmachevy Sisters were internally selected to represent Russia in the Eurovision Song Contest 2014 in Copenhagen, Denmark with the song "Shine". They finished in seventh place with 89 points.

The Tolmachevy Sisters were the subject of booing from the audience during the semi-final and final. The booing was also heard when countries awarded points to Russia. Fraser Nelson wrote: "I can’t remember the last time I heard a Eurovision audience boo anyone; during the Iraq war in 2003, no one booed Britain".

2015–present: After Eurovision
At the Eurovision Song Contest 2019, both sisters were members of the Russian jury.

Discography

Albums

Singles

See also
 Russia in the Junior Eurovision Song Contest 2006
 Russia in the Eurovision Song Contest 2014

Notes

References

1997 births
Living people
Musicians from Kursk
Russian twins
Russian child singers
Russian women musicians
Junior Eurovision Song Contest entrants for Russia
Junior Eurovision Song Contest winners
Eurovision Song Contest entrants of 2014
21st-century Russian singers
21st-century Russian women singers
Identical twin actresses
Twin musical duos
Female musical duos
Russian musical duos